South Carolina Highway 124 (SC 124) is a  state highway in the U.S. state of South Carolina. The highway connects Parker and Greenville.

Route description
SC 124 begins at an intersection with U.S. Route 123 (US 123; Calhoun Memorial Highway) southwest of Parker, within Pickens County. It travels to the northeast and immediately crosses Georges Creek. It curves to the east-northeast and crosses the Saluda River, where it enters Greenville County and Parker. It begins paralleling some railroad tracks just before intersecting SC 253 at its southern terminus and an interchange with U.S. Route 25 (US 25; White Horse Road). It passes Graceland Cemetery West. On the northeastern corner of the cemetery, the highway curves to the east-southeast and leaves the railroad tracks. It crosses some railroad tracks and curves to the east-northeast. It enters Greenville and begins to curve to the southeast. It has a second intersection with US 123 (Easley Bridge Road/Academy Street). Just northwest of the Greenville Senior High Academy of Law, Finance, and Business, the highway meets its eastern terminus, an intersection with Anderson Street (where SC 81 also ends) and Vardry Street.

Major intersections

See also

References

External links

SC 124 at Virginia Highways' South Carolina Highways Annex

124
Transportation in Pickens County, South Carolina
Transportation in Greenville County, South Carolina
Transportation in Greenville, South Carolina